Duggingen railway station is a railway station in the municipality of Duggingen, in the Swiss canton of Basel-Landschaft. It is an intermediate stop on the Basel–Biel/Bienne line and is served by local trains only.

Services 
Duggingen is served by the S3 of the Basel S-Bahn:

 : half-hourly service from Porrentruy or Laufen to Olten.

References

External links 
 
 

Railway stations in Basel-Landschaft
Swiss Federal Railways stations